Joshua W. Hering (March 8, 1833 – September 23, 1913) was an American politician, physician and banker. He served as a member of the Maryland Senate from 1896 to 1900 and as Comptroller of Maryland from 1900 to 1904 and 1908 to 1910.

Early life and education
Joshua W. Hering was born on March 8, 1833, in Johnsville, Frederick County, Maryland, to Margaret (née Orr) and Daniel S. Hering. He was educated in public schools and graduated from the University of Maryland School of Medicine in 1855.

Career
Hering practiced medicine in Westminster, Maryland, following his graduation, from 1855 to 1867. In 1867, worked part time as a physician due to ill health. In 1867, Hering was elected cashier of the Union National Bank of Westminster. He worked there until 1913. He also worked as a financier. In 1870, Hering became a charter member of the Mutual Fire Insurance Company of Carroll County. He served as president of that organization after 1872.

In 1895, Hering was elected as a Democrat to the Maryland Senate. He served two terms, from 1896 to 1900. He was a member of the finance committee and the corporation committee. He served as chair of the Committee on Reevaluation and Assessment and the Joint Conference Committee. In 1899, Hering was elected as Comptroller of Maryland. He served from 1900 to 1904. He was elected again in 1907. He served from 1908 to 1910. On June 1, 1910, Hering resigned as comptroller to accept an appointment by Governor Austin Lane Crothers as a member of the Public Service Commission of Maryland for a term of four years. He served in this role until his death.

In 1892, Hering was elected as president of the General Conference of the Methodist Protestant Church. He served again as president in 1896. He was a member of the General Conference from 1870 to 1904. He was a co-founder and member of the board of governors of the Westminster Theological Seminary. He was also a member of the Methodist Protestant Church Home. He was elected as president of the Maryland Bankers' Association in 1899. He was a charter member of the Maryland Educational Endowment Society of the Methodist Protestant Church and a member of the board of managers of the Westminster Cemetery Company. He also served as director of the Baltimore and Reistertown Turnpike Company.

Hering was a charter member of the board of trustees of Western Maryland College. For a time, he served as president of the board of trustees.

Personal life
Hering married Margaret Henrietta Trumbo, daughter of Lewis Trumbo, on October 18, 1855. They had two sons and two daughters, Joseph T., Charles E., Mrs. Thomas A. Murray and Mrs. Frank Z. Miller. His wife died on September 27, 1883. Hering married Catherine E. Armacost, daughter of John Armacost, on March 7, 1888. They had no children.

Hering lived in Westminster. He died on September 23, 1913, in Westminster. He was buried at Westminster Cemetery.

Legacy and awards
Hering received an honorary Master of Arts degree from Western Maryland College in 1885. He received an honorary Doctor of Laws from St. John's College in Annapolis in 1900 and an honorary Doctor of Laws from the University of Maryland School of Law in 1909.

References

External links
Maryland State Archives: Joshua W. Hering

1833 births
1913 deaths
People from Frederick County, Maryland
People from Westminster, Maryland
University of Maryland School of Medicine alumni
McDaniel College people
Democratic Party members of the Maryland House of Delegates
Comptrollers of Maryland
Methodists from Maryland
Physicians from Maryland
19th-century American physicians
19th-century American politicians
20th-century American politicians